Koza is a commune in Mayo-Tsanaga Department, Cameroon. In 2005, the population was recorded at 81076.

Villages
The following villages are located within the commune:
Bigdé
Djingliya
Gabass
Gaboua
Gaivoukida
Galdala
Gouzda
Guedjélé
Hirché
Houva
Kilda
Makandai
Maltamaya
Mawa
Mbardam
Modoko
Morgoa
Moulaï
Moutchikar
Mouzoua
Ngjengué
Oulad
Tendéo
Ziler

References

Communes of Far North Region (Cameroon)